Tony Brent (born Reginald Hogan Bretagne, 26 August 1927 – 19 June 1993) was a British traditional pop music singer, most active in the 1950s.  He scored seven Top 20 chart hits in the UK over an almost six-year period, starting in December 1952.

Biography
Brent was born Reginald Hogan Bretagne of Anglo-Indian descent and lived at Ebrahim Terrace, Spence Road, Byculla, Bombay, India. During the 1950s Brent became a popular UK-based vocalist, having relocated there in 1947. Two years after his move, Brent entered and won in a talent show held at the Regal Theatre in Kingston. He had sung a version of "Some Enchanted Evening", and this led him on to work with Ambrose and Cyril Stapleton's BBC Showband. His subsequent chart hits included "Walkin' to Missouri", "Cindy, Oh Cindy" and "Dark Moon". Brent's hits were all released on the Columbia label. He enjoyed iconic status in South Asia, where his hits topped the music charts on Radio Ceylon.

He resumed his travels in 1961 and left the UK to live in Australia. He owned a succession of Indian food restaurants whilst maintaining his singing career. Brent died in Sydney at the age of 65 of a heart attack in June 1993. His ashes were scattered in the Ganges.

Chart single discography
All entries relate to the UK Singles Chart
"Walkin' to Missouri" (1952) – no. 7
"Make It Soon" (1953) – no. 9
"Got You on My Mind" (1953) – no. 12
"Cindy, Oh Cindy" (1956) – no. 16
"Dark Moon" (1957) – no. 17
"The Clouds Will Soon Roll By" (1958) – no. 20
"Girl of My Dreams" (1958) – no. 16
"Why Should I Be Lonely?" (1959) – no. 24

See also
List of Anglo-Indians

References

External links
 
British Pathé footage of Brent with Mike and Bernie Winters

1927 births
1993 deaths
Traditional pop music singers
20th-century British male singers
English expatriates in Australia
Columbia Records artists
English people of Indian descent